Greatest Hits Live is a compilation of live songs recorded by the Who throughout their history. The album was released exclusively on the iTunes Store on 19 January 2010. This collection was released as a compact disc on 23 March 2010.

Track listing
All songs written by Pete Townshend.

Disc one
"I Can't Explain" (San Francisco Civic Auditorium, San Francisco, 1971) – 2:32
"Substitute" (San Francisco Civic Auditorium, San Francisco, 1971) – 2:10
"Happy Jack" (City Hall, Hull, England, 1970) – 2:12
"I'm a Boy" (City Hall, Hull, England, 1970) – 2:42
"Behind Blue Eyes" (San Francisco Civic Auditorium, San Francisco, California, 1971) – 3:39
"Pinball Wizard" (Vetch Field, Swansea, Wales, 1976) – 2:48
"I'm Free" (Vetch Field, Swansea, Wales, 1976) – 1:44
"Squeeze Box" (Vetch Field, Swansea, Wales, 1976) – 2:51 (Previously released on 1996 The Who by Numbers reissue)
"Naked Eye/Let's See Action/My Generation Blues (Medley)" (Charlton Athletic Football Club, Charlton, South London, England, 1974) – 14:19
"5:15" (The Capital Centre, Largo, Maryland, 1973) – 5:53
"Won't Get Fooled Again" (The Capital Centre, Largo, Maryland 1973) – 8:38
"Magic Bus" (University of Leeds Refectory, University of Leeds, Leeds, West Yorkshire, England, 1970) – 7:33 (this version is the original Live at Leeds LP version, which features a section played backwards)
"My Generation" (Aeolian Hall, London, England, 1965) – 3:25 (Previously released on BBC Sessions)

Disc two
"I Can See for Miles" (Universal Amphitheatre, Los Angeles, 1989) – 3:45
"Join Together" (Universal Amphitheatre, Los Angeles, 1989) – 5:09
"Love, Reign o'er Me" (Universal Amphitheatre, Los Angeles, 1989) – 5:53
"Baba O'Riley" (Universal Amphitheatre, Los Angeles, 1989) – 5:16
"Who Are You" (Universal Amphitheatre, Los Angeles, 1989) – 6:22
"The Real Me" (Watford Civic Hall, Watford, England, 2002) – 6:44
"The Kids Are Alright" (Royal Albert Hall, London, England, 2002)  – 4:03
"Eminence Front" (Brisbane Entertainment Centre, Brisbane, Australia, 2009) – 5:50
"A Man in a Purple Dress" (Nassau Coliseum, Uniondale, New York, 2007) – 4:28

References

The Who live albums
2010 live albums
Geffen Records live albums